Ilaro Stadium is a multi-use stadium in Ilaro, Nigeria.  Built in 2008, it is currently used mostly for football matches and is a home stadium for Gateway F.C.  The stadium has a capacity of 12,000 people. The stadium is currently located at Idogo Road in Ilaro.

External links
OGUN AWARDS CONTRACT FOR ILARO STADIUM  (October 13, 2006)
Awolowo Athletics meet ends today (December 19 2008)
The National Youth Athletics Trials bring Ilaro Stadium to life

Football venues in Nigeria
Ogun State
Sports venues completed in 2008
21st-century architecture in Nigeria